Optic atrophy 3 protein is a protein that in humans is encoded by the OPA3 gene.

See also
 3-Methylglutaconic aciduria

References

Further reading

External links
  GeneReviews/NCBI/NIH/UW entry on 3-Methylglutaconic Aciduria Type 3
  OMIM entries on 3-Methylglutaconic Aciduria Type 3